Yokenella is a genus of bacteria of the family Enterobacteriaceae. Yokenella are Gram-negative, motile, rod-shaped bacteria.  Strains of bacteria forming this genus were originally isolated from clinical samples and from insects. There is only one species in this genus: Yokenella regensburgei.

References

External links
J.P. Euzéby: List of Prokaryotic names with Standing in Nomenclature - Genus Yokenella

Enterobacteriaceae
Monotypic bacteria genera
Bacteria genera